Birán is a village in Holguín Province of Cuba, hamlet and consejo popular of Cueto, best known as the birthplace of Ramón, Fidel, and Raúl Castro. Their father owned a 23,000 acre (93 km²) plantation there.

History
Until the 1976 municipal reform, the village was part of the neighboring municipality of Mayarí.

A farm in Birán was the birthplace of former Cuban revolutionary and leader Fidel Castro.

Geography

See also
Nicaro-Levisa
Guatemala (village)

References

Populated places in Holguín Province
Fidel Castro
Mayarí